NBA Live 2004 is the 2004 installment of the NBA Live video games series. The cover features Vince Carter as a member of the Toronto Raptors and in Spain copies of NBA Live 2004 feature Raul Lopez. The game was developed by EA Sports and released in 2003. The game is similar graphically to NCAA March Madness 2004 and has the same create-a-player models. It was also the last EA game to feature Michael Jordan.

Game modes

Season 

Season mode play allows the player to choose an NBA team to compete for the season trophy. Players can also choose how many games there are during the season. A custom player option also allows game players to create their own team of NBA players. There is also a Roster management where game players can buy and sell players from various teams in the  NBA.

Dynasty 

Dynasty mode is similar to season mode but instead, teams compete for the Dynasty trophy. In this mode however, points earned from gameplay in games can be spent on individual and team training sessions to improve the skill level of the player's team. Points can also be spent in the 'NBA store' on shoes, jerseys, headbands, and socks. These clothing items can then be applied to the players of the team and are seen during gameplay. One of the main goals of Dynasty mode is the process of drafting and developing new players.

One on one 

In this mode players go one on one with an opponent in either a gym or street court; they can edit the number of baskets to win the game.

Training

In this mode, the game player can practice and improve court skills.

Features

The new button layout now allows the player to choose when to shoot and when to dunk/layup. The new system improves on previous frustrations with three-foot jumpers and losing possessions because of unnecessary dunk attempts. The "pro hop" has finally been introduced into the game and with it the ability to split defenders, or throw an opposing defender off rhythm. Not to be outdone, big men were given the ability to "power dribble", which creates space into the lane for an easier basket. Yet, with the newly improved defense and AI, coming by points is that much more difficult. In addition, freestyle dribbling is no longer an end-all to improving the game, and handling stats actually affect the player's ability to freestyle.

This was also the first game to feature the Charlotte Bobcats; they are the worst team in the game with a rating of 50. Since the game's rosters were finalized before the expansion draft, the Bobcats' lineup consisted of players named after their specific positions, for example, the point guard was named "Point Guard".

Reception

The game received "favorable" reviews on all platforms according to video game review aggregator Metacritic. In Japan, Famitsu gave the PlayStation 2 version a score of three eights and one seven for a total of 31 out of 40.

References

External links
 

2003 video games
Electronic Arts games
NBA Live
Windows games
PlayStation 2 games
Xbox games
GameCube games
Video games developed in Canada
Video games set in 2003
Video games set in 2004